The 2012 Monaco GP2 Series round was the fifth round of the 2012 GP2 Series season. It was held on May 26–28, 2012 at Circuit de Monaco, Monte Carlo, Monaco. The race was used to support the 2012 Monaco Grand Prix.

Classification

Qualifying
The qualifying session was divided into two groups in order to avoid accidents due to the overcrowding on the track. Following a ballot, Group A was formed by cars with even numbers and Group B by those with odd numbers. The grid was formed in two rows in order from the sessions.

Group A

Group B

Qualifying summary

Feature race

Notes:
 — Esteban Gutiérrez was classified as having finished the race, as he had completed 90% of the winners race distance.

Sprint race

Standings after the round

Drivers' Championship standings

Teams' Championship standings

 Note: Only the top five positions are included for both sets of standings.

See also 
 2012 Monaco Grand Prix
 2012 Monaco GP3 Series round

References

Monaco
GP2
Motorsport in Monaco